CD Review (formerly known as Digital Audio and Digital Audio and Compact Disc Review) is a discontinued American monthly magazine that specialized in reviewing albums and audio electronics, especially compact discs. The magazine was founded by publisher Wayne Green. The magazine lasted from September 1984 to May 1996.

History
In the first issue of CD Review (as Digital Audio), Ken Pohlmann, columnist for Audio and assistant professor at the University of Miami, introduced the magazine's purpose. Pohlmann wrote "This monthly column will examine the professional side of digital audio, offering slices of insight and wisdom, as well as gossip from the recording studio and the manufacturers that equip it. In this way, the listening community will understand the sometimes invisible origins of recorded music." Pohlmann also wrote that CD sales would eventually outsell LPs and would eventually become "the dominant medium for home, car, and portable listening." Among the first reviews for the magazine include Abbey Road by The Beatles, Synchronicity by The Police, The Key by Joan Armatrading, and Secret Messages by Electric Light Orchestra, all of which were released on compact discs.

References

Monthly magazines published in the United States
Music magazines published in the United States
Defunct magazines published in the United States
Magazines established in 1984
Magazines disestablished in 1996
Magazines published in New Hampshire